Ephemerophila is a genus of moths in the family Geometridae.

Species
 Ephemerophila decorata (Moore, [1868])
 Ephemerophila humeraria (Moore, [1868])
 Ephemerophila subterminalis (Prout, 1925)

References
 Ephemerophila at Markku Savela's Lepidoptera and Some Other Life Forms
 Natural History Museum Lepidoptera genus database

Boarmiini